Astragalus tragacantha, commonly known as astragale de Marseille or coussin-de-belle-mère, is a species of milkvetch in the family Fabaceae.

 The plant is about 10 to 25 cm in height with white, purple tinged flowers that bloom in April and March. Tragacantha grows in sandy soil around beaches and is native to France, Spain, and the Mediterranean.

References

tragacantha
Flora of Spain
Flora of France